The 2018–19 North Alabama Lions women's basketball team represented University of North Alabama during the 2018–19 NCAA Division I women's basketball season. They were led by head coach Missy Tiber in her sixth season at North Alabama. The Lions played their home games at the Flowers Hall in Florence, Alabama as members of the Atlantic Sun Conference.

This season is North Alabama's first of a four-year transition period from Division II to Division I. As a result, the Lions are not eligible for NCAA postseason play but can participate in the ASUN Tournament. They received an invitation to play in the WBI, where they advanced to the semifinals before losing to North Texas.

Previous season
The Lions finished the 2017–18 season 24-5, 17-3 to finish in second place in Gulf South Conference play. They lost in the first round of the Gulf South tournament, losing to West Alabama. They were invited to the NCAA tournament and lost in the first round to Lee University. The season marked the last season in Division II and the Gulf South Conference for the Lions.

Roster

Schedule and results 

|-
!colspan=12 style=| Non-Conference Regular Season
|-

|-

|-

|-

|-

|-

|-

|-

|-

|-

|-
!colspan=9 style=| ASUN Regular Season

|-

|-

|-

|-

|-

|-

|-

|-

|-

|-

|-

|-

|-

|-

|-

|-
!colspan=12 style=| ASUN Tournament

|-
!colspan=12 style=| WBI Tournament

Source:

References

North Alabama
North Alabama Lions women's basketball seasons
North Alabama Lions women's basketball
North Alabama Lions women's basketball
North Alabama